Alt Zauche-Wußwerk is a municipality in the district of Dahme-Spreewald in Brandenburg in Germany.

Demography

References 

Localities in Dahme-Spreewald